The 2002–03 season was Birmingham City Football Club's 100th in the English football league system, their 51st in the top tier, and their debut season in the Premier League, having been promoted via the play-offs. Under the management of Steve Bruce, they finished in 13th position in the 20-team league. Birmingham entered the 2002–03 FA Cup at the third round and lost to Fulham in that round, and, having entered the League Cup in the second round, lost to Preston North End in the third.

French manufacturers Le Coq Sportif supplied Birmingham's kit for the fifth consecutive season, and mobile phone retailer Phones4U retained the shirt sponsorship. Stern John was top scorer with nine goals in all competitions; if only league goals are considered, Clinton Morrison top-scored with six. Steve Vickers was club captain, but his long absences through injury meant that vice-captain Jeff Kenna usually captained the team.

Pre-season

Pre-season friendlies

Premier League

Season review

Birmingham's first season in the Premiership was a rollercoaster of a ride that resulted in the team finishing in 13th, although they were favourites to be relegated at the start of the season.

Once Birmingham had secured their states in the Premiership after beating Norwich City in the First Division playoff final the year before, manager Steve Bruce started to strengthen the squad. Internationals Robbie Savage of Wales, Kenny Cunningham and Clinton Morrison of Ireland, and Aliou Cissé of Senegal all joined the side.

Stern John's penalty in the 1–1 draw with Everton on 28 August 2002 was Birmingham's first goal in the Premiership, and first in the top flight since Robert Hopkins scored against Newcastle United back in the 1985–86 season. The next match secured Birmingham their first three points in the league, as they beat Leeds United 2–1 thanks to goals from Paul Devlin and Damien Johnson.

A highlight of the season was the 3–0 victory over local rivals Aston Villa. A first-half goal from Clinton Morrison saw Birmingham in control at half time, before a comedy of errors saw a throw-in by Olof Mellberg roll under the foot of Villa goalkeeper Peter Enckelman and into the net to gift the side a 2–0 lead. Geoff Horsfield added a third later in the game thanks to bad defending from defender Alpay.

By the New Year, Birmingham were in 15th position in the table, seven points clear of 18th-placed Sunderland. This did not stop Bruce spending in the winter transfer window, as Stephen Clemence, Jamie Clapham and Matthew Upson all joined the club. These transfers fall into insignificance compared to the impact that French World Cup-winning forward Christophe Dugarry would make.

A bad start to 2003 saw Birmingham fall to 16th in the table, only five points separating themselves and 18th-placed West Bromwich Albion. This was before Liverpool's visit to St Andrew's, when Birmingham took a two-goal lead through Clemence and Morrison before Michael Owen added a late consolation goal. This game was followed by the visit to Aston Villa. The game kicked into life when Villa striker Dion Dublin was sent off in the 51st minute for headbutting Savage. In the 74th minute, Australian Stan Lazaridis scored his first goal of the season, and three minutes later, a poor header back by Jlloyd Samuel allowed Horsfield to run onto the ball, beat Enckelman and score from close range. The game ended with another sending off, as Villa's Joey Guðjónsson lunged at Upson with a two-footed tackle.

Birmingham were not yet assured of safety by the time they played Sunderland on 12 April, but Bryan Hughes and Christophe Dugarry scored to give Birmingham a 2–0 win. Dugarry went on to score four goals in Birmingham's next three games, including a stunning effort against Middlesbrough where he beat the offside trap before calmly taking the ball out of the air with his knee and volleying it into the net.

The last game of the season saw the side entertain West Ham United, who were in real danger of relegation. Birmingham managed a 2–2 draw thanks to goals from Horsfield and John, but it was enough to send the Hammers down.

Match details

Final league table

Results summary

FA Cup

Birmingham failed to get past the third round of the FA Cup, losing to Premiership side Fulham.

League Cup

Birmingham reached the third round of the League Cup before losing to Preston North End of the First Division.

Transfers

In

 Brackets round club names indicate the player's contract with that club had expired before he joined Birmingham.

Out

 Brackets round a club denote the player joined that club after his Birmingham City contract expired.

Loan in

Loan out

Appearances and goals

Numbers in parentheses denote appearances as substitute.
Players with squad numbers struck through and marked  left the club during the playing season.
Players with names in italics and marked * were on loan from another club for the whole of their season with Birmingham.

References
General
 
 
 Source for match dates, league positions and results: 
 Source for lineups, appearances, goalscorers and attendances: Matthews (2010), Complete Record, pp. 440–41.
 Source for goal times: 
 Source for transfers: 

Specific

Birmingham City F.C. seasons
Birmingham City